The Stadler KISS is a family of bilevel electric multiple unit commuter trains developed and built since 2008 by Stadler Rail of Switzerland. As of 2016, 242 KISS trainsets comprising 1,145 cars have been sold to operators in eleven countries.

Name
In the early stages of its development, the KISS was known as the Stadler DOSTO. This name was derived from the German word Doppelstock, meaning "double decker".

Since September 2010, Stadler refers to the train as "KISS", an acronym for "Komfortabler Innovativer Spurtstarker S-Bahn-Zug", meaning "comfortable, innovative, sprint-capable suburban train". Transitio in Sweden uses the name "DOSTO" because "kiss" means "pee" in Swedish.

In Swiss Federal Railways service, the train is classified as RABe 511. For the Eastern European market, it is branded "Eurasia".

Features
The KISS vehicles are the third generation of vehicles for the S-Bahn Zürich. Compared to previous generations, they are characterized mainly by a higher number of standing passengers per car, in part because the longer trains have proportionately fewer cabs. The trains are 15 cm wider due to placing the HVAC channels under the ceiling instead of behind side panels. The headroom is still two meters, because friction stir welded floor panels made from aluminium extrusions are used. The number of seats, however, is slightly lower than in the previous models. Like in the KISS's predecessors, low-floor entrances, vehicle air conditioning and vacuum toilets (two, including one wheelchair accessible) are available. There are also two multi-functional areas with storage space for strollers, bicycles and the like.

The six-car train set consists of two head power cars and four intermediate trailers. In the power heads, all axles are powered. The "Eurasia" version for the Russian gauge railways, in a six and four-car formation, has two trailer heads and two shorter intermediate power cars, and also two intermediate trailers in a six car formation. A special diesel-electric version of the "Eurasia" train, which first appeared in 2021, is manufactured in an eight-car formation, including 2 double-deck head cars, 2 diesel generator cars, 3 intermediate double-deck cars and 1 single-deck car.

The upcoming Iberian gauge KISS vehicles for Renfe in Spain, expected to enter service in 2024, will feature a combination of single-deck FLIRT end cars joined by either two double-decker KISS intermediate cars or with two extra single-deck FLIRT intermediate cars. 

The train's power plant is capable of delivering brief bursts (several minutes) of "sprint" power, over 6,000 kilowatts, enabling it to overtake other trains on short express tracks.

Customers

Gallery

See also
 List of stock used by Swiss Federal Railways
 Bombardier Omneo
 SBB-CFF-FFS RABe 514 (Siemens Desiro)
 SJ X40 (Alstom Coradia)
 ČD Class 471 (CityElefant)
 UZ Class 675 (Škoda EJ 675)

References

External links 

 Stadler Rail KISS (official website)
 Spec Sheet; French

Double-decker EMUs
Multiple units of Switzerland
 
Stadler Rail multiple units
Electric multiple units of the United States
25 kV AC multiple units
3000 V DC multiple units
15 kV AC multiple units
Electric multiple units of Germany
Multiple units of Sweden
Passenger trains running at least at 200 km/h in commercial operations